Club MTV (formerly MTV Dance) is an Australian pay television channel that broadcasts dance and urban music. It was launched on 3 December 2013.

History
On 29 October 2013, MTV announced they had been working with Foxtel since early 2013 to offer more diversity on the Foxtel platform, as their two current music dedicated channels - MTV Classic and MTV Hits - fought for the same audience as Foxtel Networks channels MAX and [V] Hits respectively. As such, it was decided that MTV Classic and MTV Hits would cease broadcasting on the Foxtel platform to be replaced by two new MTV channels. The channel to replace MTV Classic was MTV Dance, a channel dedicated to dance, hip hop, and R&B music from around the world - MTV's first channel to be dedicated to three different genres of music.

On 1 July 2020, the channel rebranded as Club MTV, inline with its pan-European edition and UK & Ireland edition. The brand will also be extended to an uninterrupted, Stingray Music-powered Foxtel Tunes channel.

Logo

Programming
 Backyard Bangers
Club Classics
Fresh Drops
Going Up on a Tuesday
Hip Hop & R'n'B Chart Top 20
Hip Hop Hooray
Hot 'n' Fresh!
Hot Right Now x15
Late Night Urban 
Midnight Mix
Ministry of Sound Official Top 20
 MTV Up Late
 Morning Rhythm
Party Like It's...
R&B Friday
Retro Rage
Rewind
Saturday Warm Up!
Sunday Sessions
The After Party
Throwback Thursday
 #waybackwednesday
 Weekend Wind Down x50
Weekend Workout
 #UrbanTrending

See also
 Club MTV (British and Irish TV channel)
 Club MTV (European TV channel)
 MTV
 MTV Classic
 MTV Hits
 Nickelodeon
 Nick Jr.

References

External links

Dance music television channels
English-language television stations in Australia
Television channels and stations established in 2013
MTV channels
Music video networks in Australia